Rubodvirus is a recently described plant virus genus belonging to the family Phenuiviridae in the order Bunyavirales. These plant viruses are transmitted from plant to plant through graft transmission.

Diseases
Apple rubbery wood, thought to be caused by Apple rubodvirus, is a disease of apple trees that is characterized by flexible limbs and atrophy of the vascular tissue. Grape Garan dmak virus (GGDV) and Grape muscat rose virus (GMRV) are both diseases of grapevines caused by species of Grape rubodvirus.

Taxonomy
Rubodvirus was created to encompass Apple rubodvirus after it was determined to be caused by a virus, and not phytoplasmas, as previously thought.
With Grapevine rubodvirus, genetic sequencing showed great protein similarity with the recently discovered Apple rubodviruses 1 and 2, placing GMRV and GGDV in the genus rubodvirus. The name "Rubodvirus" comes from Rub- in "rubbery", and -od in "wood".

The genus contains the following species:

Apple rubodvirus 1
Apple rubodvirus 2
Grapevine rubodvirus 1
Grapevine rubodvirus 2

References

External links
ICTVdB—The Universal Virus Database, version 3.
 Viralzone: Tenuivirus

Tenuiviruses
Viral plant pathogens and diseases
Virus genera